

563001–563100 

|-bgcolor=#f2f2f2
| colspan=4 align=center | 
|}

563101–563200 

|-bgcolor=#f2f2f2
| colspan=4 align=center | 
|}

563201–563300 

|-bgcolor=#f2f2f2
| colspan=4 align=center | 
|}

563301–563400 

|-id=318
| 563318 ten Kate ||  || Inge Loes ten Kate (born 1976) is a Dutch astrobiologist and planetologist at Utrecht University. She is a specialist on Martian geoscience and has helped to develop instruments for the Mars rover Curiosity (Src). || 
|}

563401–563500 

|-bgcolor=#f2f2f2
| colspan=4 align=center | 
|}

563501–563600 

|-bgcolor=#f2f2f2
| colspan=4 align=center | 
|}

563601–563700 

|-bgcolor=#f2f2f2
| colspan=4 align=center | 
|}

563701–563800 

|-id=716
| 563716 Szinyeimersepál ||  || Pál Szinyei Merse (1845–1920) a Hungarian painter and one of the most influential figures in Hungarian art, being the first true colorist in the history of Hungarian painting. || 
|}

563801–563900 

|-bgcolor=#f2f2f2
| colspan=4 align=center | 
|}

563901–564000 

|-bgcolor=#f2f2f2
| colspan=4 align=center | 
|}

References 

563001-564000